Benjamin Earnest McLin (September 22, 1851 – January 31, 1912) was a lawyer, businessman and politician, who was a member of the Florida State Senate, and was the second Commissioner of Agriculture of Florida.

McLin was engaged in the milling business in Lake county. He was also extensively invested in growing and shipping oranges.   At one time he also operated the largest orange crate manufacturer in Florida, however his plant burnt down and was entirely being wiped out by fire, unfortunately he had no insurance on the plant. Not long after his plant was destroyed, the freeze of 1894–95 swept away his entire orange grove.

He died on January 31, 1912, while attending the Orlando County Fair.

References

 

1851 births
1912 deaths
Florida Commissioners of Agriculture
Tennessee lawyers
Florida lawyers
Democratic Party Florida state senators
People from Greene County, Tennessee
People from Lake County, Florida
19th-century American politicians
19th-century American lawyers